Milène Larsson is a Swedish journalist, producer, and managing editor of Vice magazine.

Early life and career
Larsson was born in Stockholm, Sweden. Before joining Vice when it launched in Sweden in 2004, she played guitar in an all girl punk rock band, started DJing, studied graphic design, and worked for the nightlife guide Nöjesguiden. While working for Vice she has covered different things such as FEMEN, Gezi parks protests, the Western Sahara conflict, and the Russian LGBT propaganda law

See also
Vice News
Vice Media

References

External links 

Year of birth missing (living people)
Living people
Swedish journalists
Managing editors